Jana Novotná was the defending champion but lost in the quarterfinals to Lindsay Davenport.

Martina Hingis won in the final 7–5, 6–7, 7–6 against Davenport.

Seeds
A champion seed is indicated in bold text while text in italics indicates the round in which that seed was eliminated. The top four seeds received a bye to the second round.

  Martina Hingis (champion)
  Jana Novotná (quarterfinals)
  Amanda Coetzer (quarterfinals)
  Monica Seles (quarterfinals)
  Lindsay Davenport (final)
  Iva Majoli (first round)
  Irina Spîrlea (semifinals)
  Arantxa Sánchez Vicario (semifinals)

Draw

Final

Section 1

Section 2

External links
 1997 Advanta Championships of Philadelphia Draw

Advanta Championships of Philadelphia
1997 WTA Tour